In number theory, the Fermat quotient of an integer a with respect to an odd prime p is defined as

or

.

This article is about the former; for the latter see p-derivation. The quotient is named after Pierre de Fermat.

If the base a is coprime to the exponent p then Fermat's little theorem says that qp(a) will be an integer. If the base a is also a generator of the multiplicative group of integers modulo p, then qp(a) will be a cyclic number, and p will be a full reptend prime.

Properties
From the definition, it is obvious that

In 1850, Gotthold Eisenstein proved that if a and b are both coprime to p, then:

Eisenstein likened the first two of these congruences to properties of logarithms. These properties imply

In 1895, Dmitry Mirimanoff pointed out that an iteration of Eisenstein's rules gives the corollary:

From this, it follows that:

Lerch's formula 

M. Lerch proved in 1905 that

Here  is the Wilson quotient.

Special values

Eisenstein discovered that the Fermat quotient with base 2 could be expressed in terms of the sum of the reciprocals modulo p of the numbers lying in the first half of the range {1, ..., p − 1}:

Later writers showed that the number of terms required in such a representation could be reduced from 1/2 to 1/4, 1/5, or even 1/6:

Eisenstein's series also has an increasingly complex connection to the Fermat quotients with other bases, the first few examples being:

Generalized Wieferich primes
If qp(a) ≡ 0 (mod p) then ap−1 ≡ 1 (mod p2). Primes for which this is true for a = 2 are called Wieferich primes. In general they are called Wieferich primes base a. Known solutions of qp(a) ≡ 0 (mod p) for small values of a are:

{| class="wikitable"
|-----
! a
! p (checked up to 5 × 1013)
! OEIS sequence
|-----
| 1 || 2, 3, 5, 7, 11, 13, 17, 19, 23, 29, ... (All primes)
| 
|-----
| 2 || 1093, 3511
| 
|-----
| 3 || 11, 1006003
| 
|-----
| 4 || 1093, 3511
|
|-----
| 5 || 2, 20771, 40487, 53471161, 1645333507, 6692367337, 188748146801
| 
|-----
| 6 || 66161, 534851, 3152573
| 
|-----
| 7 || 5, 491531
| 
|-----
| 8 || 3, 1093, 3511
|
|-----
| 9 || 2, 11, 1006003
|
|-----
| 10 || 3, 487, 56598313
| 
|-----
| 11 || 71
| 
|-----
| 12 || 2693, 123653
| 
|-----
| 13 || 2, 863, 1747591
| 
|-----
| 14 || 29, 353, 7596952219
| 
|-----
| 15 || 29131, 119327070011
| 
|-----
| 16 || 1093, 3511
|
|-----
| 17 || 2, 3, 46021, 48947, 478225523351 
| 
|-----
| 18 || 5, 7, 37, 331, 33923, 1284043
| 
|-----
| 19 || 3, 7, 13, 43, 137, 63061489
| 
|-----
| 20 || 281, 46457, 9377747, 122959073
| 
|-----
| 21 || 2
|
|-----
| 22 || 13, 673, 1595813, 492366587, 9809862296159
| 
|-----
| 23 || 13, 2481757, 13703077, 15546404183, 2549536629329 
| 
|-----
| 24 || 5, 25633
|
|-----
| 25 || 2, 20771, 40487, 53471161, 1645333507, 6692367337, 188748146801
|
|-----
| 26 || 3, 5, 71, 486999673, 6695256707
|
|-----
| 27 || 11, 1006003
|
|-----
| 28 || 3, 19, 23
|
|-----
| 29 || 2
|
|-----
| 30 || 7, 160541, 94727075783
|
|}

For more information, see  and.

The smallest solutions of qp(a) ≡ 0 (mod p) with a = n are:

2, 1093, 11, 1093, 2, 66161, 5, 3, 2, 3, 71, 2693, 2, 29, 29131, 1093, 2, 5, 3, 281, 2, 13, 13, 5, 2, 3, 11, 3, 2, 7, 7, 5, 2, 46145917691, 3, 66161, 2, 17, 8039, 11, 2, 23, 5, 3, 2, 3, ... 

A pair (p, r) of prime numbers such that qp(r) ≡ 0 (mod p) and qr(p) ≡ 0 (mod r) is called a Wieferich pair.

References

External links
 Gottfried Helms. Fermat-/Euler-quotients (ap-1 – 1)/pk with arbitrary k.
 Richard Fischer. Fermat quotients B^(P-1) == 1 (mod P^2).

Number theory